"Décalé Gwada" is the first single by Jessy Matador, from his debut album Afrikan New Style. The single cover credits the single to Jessy Matador aka La Selesao in reference to the collective that besides Matador included, Docta Love, Linho (later on members of Les Jumo and Benkoff. In great difference, the follow-up single "Mini Kawoulé" credited just Jessy Matador.

The single "Décalé Gwada" was released on 30 June 2008 in France and peaked at number 14 in the French Singles Chart. It was also a hit in Belgium reaching #23 in Ultratip Wallonia chart. The song was one of the hits of that summer. As of May 2011 it has had over 25 million hits on YouTube.

Track listing
Digital download
"Décalé Gwada" – 2:55
"Décalé Gwada" (Extended) - 4:21

Chart performance

Release history

References

2008 debut singles
Jessy Matador songs
2008 songs
Wagram Music singles
Song articles with missing songwriters